Harry Palmer (born 1930 in Calgary, Alberta) is a Canadian photographer.

Background
Harry Palmer graduated from the University of British Columbia in 1951 and was working as a mechanical engineer when he discovered documentary photography. In 1984 Palmer left the oil and gas industry for photography. He attended workshops, worked with photographers such as Dr. Harry Thomson and Paul Caponigro, and studied paintings to learn composition, color, and lighting.

Works
Palmer's photographs have been featured on stamps by Canada Post in 2003 and on Alberta's 2005 Centennial Stamp. Palmer's photographs have also been exhibited in the Canadian Museum of Contemporary Photography in 1992, and are in the collection of the Library and Archives Canada.  In 2005, Palmer was nominated for the inaugural Lieutenant Governor of Alberta Arts Awards.

Bibliography
Harry Palmer has had three books of his work published:
Calgary Places & People - 1983
125 Portraits - 1992
The Tallpecs of Alberta & Saskatchewan - 2004

References

1930 births
Living people
Artists from Calgary
Canadian photographers
University of British Columbia alumni